Rachid Bouaita (born September 20, 1974 in Maubeuge, Nord) is a retired boxer from France, who competed for his native country at two consecutive Summer Olympics, starting in 1996. His best result was finishing in fifth place after being defeated by Cuba's eventual silver medalist Arnaldo Mesa.

References
sports-reference

1974 births
Living people
Bantamweight boxers
Boxers at the 1996 Summer Olympics
Boxers at the 2000 Summer Olympics
Olympic boxers of France
French male boxers